Jijabai Bhonsle (or Bhonsale, Bhosale, Bhosle) or Jadhav (12 January 1598 – 17 June 1674), referred to as Rajmata, Rastramata, Jijabai or Jijau, was the mother of Shivaji, founder of the Maratha Empire. She was a daughter of Lakhujirao Jadhav of Sindkhed Raja.

History
Jijabai was born on 12 January 1598, to Mahalasabai Jadhav and Lakhuji Jadhav of Deulgaon, near Sindkhed, in present-day Buldhana district of Maharastra. Lakhojiraje Jadhav was a Maratha noble.  Jijabai was married at an early age to Shahaji Bhosle, son of Maloji Bhosle of Verul village, a military commander serving under the Nizam Shahi sultans. She taught Shivaji about swarajya and raised him to be a warrior. Jijabai died on 17 June 1674. Jijabai belonged to the clan of jadhavas of Sindkhed Raja, who also claimed descent from the Yadavas.

Life and work
When Shivaji was 14 years old, Shahaji Raje handed over the Jagir of Pune to him. Of course, the responsibility of managing the Jagir fell on Jijabai. Jijabai and Shivaji arrived in Pune with skilled officers. Due to the persistent interests of Nizamshah, Adilshah and Mughals, the condition of Pune was very bad. Under such adverse circumstances, she  redeveloped the city of Pune.
She plowed the farmland with a golden plow, giving sanctuary to the locals. She was responsible for the education of the kings. Jijabai told Shivaji stories from the Ramayana, the Mahabharata, which began and ended in independence. How mighty was Rama who killed Ravana who was depriving Sita, how mighty was Bhima who killed Bakasura and rescued weak people, etc.
Because of these rites given by Jijabai, Shivaji Raje happened. Jijabai not only told the story but also gave the first lessons of politics by sitting next to the chair.

She was also a skilled horse rider. She could wield a sword very skillfully. She managed her husband's Jagir in Pune and developed it. She established Kasba Ganapati Mandir. She also renovated Kevareshwar Temple and Tambadi Jogeshwari Temple.

Death
She died on 17 June 1674 at Pachad village near Raigad Fort. At that time it was only twelve days since the coronation of Shivaji.

In popular culture
 Legendary actress, Sulochana Latkar portrayed Jijabai in the marathi film Maratha Tituka Melvava 
Sumati Gupte played Jijabai in the 1974 film Raja Shiv Chhatrapati. 
Jijabai was a portrayed by Mrinal Kulkarni in the popular TV series Raja Shivchatrapati which aired on Star Pravah in 2008. 
 Mrinal Kulkarni played Jijabai in Farzand, an Indian Marathi language epic, historical drama film. 
 Mrinal Kulkarni played Jijabai in the 2019 Marathi language historical drama film,  Fatteshikast.
 Shilpa Tulaskar portrayed Jijabai in the 2011 series Veer Shivaji 
 Smita Deshmukh starred as Jijabai in the 2011 Marathi language film Rajmata Jijau based on the life of Jijabai, based on Madan Patil's historical novel Jijausaheb
 Prateeksha Lonkar played Jijabai in Swarajyarakshak Sambhaji, an Indian historical drama based on the life of Sambhaji. 
 Padmavati Rao plays Jijabai in the 2020 Indian Hindi-language biographical period action film, Tanhaji.
 Nishtha Vaidya, Amruta Pawar, Bhargavi Chirmule, Neena Kulkarni portray Jijabai at different stages of her life in Swarajya Janani Jijamata, a show based on the life of Rajmata Jijabai. 
 The 2011 film Rajmata Jijau is a biography of Jijabai.
 In his book Medieval India, C.V.Vaidya states that Yadavas are "definitely pure Maratha Kshatriyas". ... [ Jijabai (the mother of Shivaji, who founded the Maratha Empire) belonged to the clan of jadhavas of Sindkhed Raja, who also claimed descent from the Yadavas.

See also
 List of Maratha dynasties and states
 Maratha clan system
 Bhosale
 Maratha Kranti Morcha

References

People of the Maratha Empire
People from Maharashtra
People from Buldhana district
1598 births
1674 deaths
Marathi people
Women of the Maratha Empire
Queen mothers
Indian female royalty
16th-century Indian women]
17th-century Indian women